Turbonilla fustis is a species of sea snail, a marine gastropod mollusk in the family Pyramidellidae, the pyrams and their allies.

Description
The shell grows to a length of 3.2 mm.

Distribution
This species occurs in the following locations at depths between 42 m and 128 m:
 Gulf of Mexico: Louisiana, Texas

References

External links
 To Encyclopedia of Life
 To World Register of Marine Species

fustis
Gastropods described in 1995